EasyJet Switzerland SA, styled as easyJet, is a Swiss low-cost airline based in Meyrin, in the canton of Geneva. It operates scheduled flights as an EasyJet franchisee from Geneva Airport and EuroAirport Basel Mulhouse Freiburg.

History
The airline was established on 18 May 1988 as TEA Switzerland and started operations on 23 March 1989 as part of the TEA group. In 2013, the airline was owned by private investors (51%) and EasyJet plc (49%) and had 770 employees.

Destinations

Fleet

Current fleet 

, EasyJet Switzerland operates the following aircraft:

Historical fleet 
Over the years, the former TEA Switzerland and later EasyJet Switzerland operated the following aircraft:

References

External links

Official website

Airlines established in 1988
Airlines of Switzerland
EasyGroup
Low-cost carriers
Swiss companies established in 1988
Companies based in the canton of Geneva